The Annie Award for Best Student Film is an Annie Award given annually to the best animated films by students, the category was first presented at the 40th Annie Awards.

According to ASIFA-Hollywood, in order to be elegible for this award, "the submitted production must be entirely the work of an individual student or team of students from an accredited post-secondary, degree granting program anywhere in the world".

Winners and nominees

2010s

2020s

References

External links 
 Annie Awards: Legacy

Annie Awards
Awards established in 2012
Student media awards